The Andorran government imposes no visa requirements on its visitors and only requires a passport or European Union national identity card for entrance. However, since the country is only accessible via the Schengen countries of Spain or France, entrance is not possible without entering the Schengen area first and the Schengen visa rules can therefore be regarded to apply de facto. Because Andorra is not part of the Schengen area, a multiple entry visa is required to re-enter the Schengen area when leaving Andorra. Foreign visitors looking to stay in Andorra more than 90 days require a residence permit.

There are no airports for fixed-wing aircraft within Andorra's borders but there are, however, heliports in La Massana (Camí Heliport), Arinsal and Escaldes-Engordany with commercial helicopter services. Because of the need of going to a border control if flying outside Andorra, these helicopter services go to airports.

See also

 Visa policy of the Schengen Area
 Visa requirements for Andorran citizens
 List of diplomatic missions of Andorra
 Foreign relations of Andorra

References

Foreign relations of Andorra
Andorra